October 19 - Eastern Orthodox liturgical calendar - October 21

All fixed commemorations below celebrated on November 2 by Eastern Orthodox Churches on the Old Calendar.

For October 20th, Orthodox Churches on the Old Calendar commemorate the Saints listed on October 7.

Saints

 Martyrs Zebinas of Caesarea in Palestine, Germanus, Nicephorus and Antoninus (308)  (see also: November 12)
 Virgin-martyr Manatho (Maratho), burned alive in Scythopolis in Syria Palaestina (c. 286-305) (see also: November 12)
 Martyrs Aborsam (Eboras) and Senoe (Eunos), of Persia (c. 341)  (see also: November 10)
 Saint Barsabias, abbot and missionary who was martyred in Persia (342)
 Great-martyr Artemius, at Antioch (362)
 Venerable Basil of Trabzon, Bishop of Trabzon (early 10th century)

Pre-Schism Western saints

 Saint Maximus of Aquila, a zealous deacon of Aquila, who was martyred by being thrown off an overhanging cliff under Decius (250)
 Saint Felician of Foligno, Bishop of Foligno, martyr  (251)
 Martyrs Martha, Saula and Companions, martyrs in Cologne in Germany.
 Saint Caprasius of Agen, martyr (303)
 Saint Irene of Tomar, a nun martyred for her faith in Visigothic Portugal, honoured especially in Santarém (653)
 Saint Sindulf of Rheims, a hermit in Aussonce near Rheims in France, Confessor (660)
 Saints Bradan and Orora, two saints venerated in the Isle of Man (c. 7th century)
 Saint Acca of Hexham, Bishop of Hexham in England, Confessor (c. 740)
 Saint Vitalis of Salzburg, St Rupert's successor as Abbot of St Peter's in Salzburg and Archbishop (717-745)
 Saint Aidan, Bishop of Mayo in Ireland (768)
 Saint Bernard of Bagnorea (of Castro), Bishop of Vulcia in Tuscany, Italy (c. 800)
 Saint Aderald, an Archdeacon of Troyes, who led a pilgrimage to the Holy Land, and built the monastery of the Holy Sepulchre at Samblières (1004)

Post-Schism Orthodox saints

 Venerable Matrona of Chios the Wonderworker (1462)
 Righteous Child Artemius of Verkola (1545)
 Venerable Theodosius, Hieromonk of Svyatogorsk Monastery (1850)

New Martys and Confessors

 New Hieromartyr Nicholas Lyubomudrov, Priest of Latskoye village, Yaroslavl (1918)
 New Hieromartyr Herman (Kokel), Bishop of Alatyr (1937)
 New Hieromartyrs Zosima Pepenin, John Ganchev, John Rechkin, John Rodionov, Nicholas Figurov, Leonid Nikolsky, John Talızin and Alexander Orlov, Priests (1937)
 New Hieromartyrs Michael Isaev and Peter Kravets, Deacons (1937)
 New Martyr Paul Bocharov (1937)
 Venerable Gabriel (Urgebadze), Archimandrite of Samtavro Monastery, Georgia, Confessor and Fool for Christ (1995)

Other commemorations

 Translation of the relics (1581) of Venerable Gerasimus of Kefalonia, the New Ascetic (1579)
 Translation of the relics (1814) of New Monk-martyr Ignatius of Bulgaria and Mount Athos from Constantinople to Mount Athos (1814)
 Translation of the relics (1979) of Venerable Gregory (Kallides) of Herakleia (1925)
 Uncovering of the relics (2012) of New Hieromartyr Nikodim (Kononov), Bishop of Belgorod (1918)  (see also: October 22)
 Repose of Abbot Theodosius (Popov) of Optina Monastery (1903)
 Repose of Metropolitan John (Snychev) of St. Petersburg (1995)

Icon gallery

Notes

References

Sources 
 October 20 / November 2. Orthodox Calendar (PRAVOSLAVIE.RU).
 November 2 / October 20. HOLY TRINITY RUSSIAN ORTHODOX CHURCH (A parish of the Patriarchate of Moscow).
 October 20. OCA - The Lives of the Saints.
 The Autonomous Orthodox Metropolia of Western Europe and the Americas (ROCOR). St. Hilarion Calendar of Saints for the year of our Lord 2004. St. Hilarion Press (Austin, TX). p. 78.
 The Twentieth Day of the Month of October. Orthodoxy in China.
 October 20. Latin Saints of the Orthodox Patriarchate of Rome.
 The Roman Martyrology. Transl. by the Archbishop of Baltimore. Last Edition, According to the Copy Printed at Rome in 1914. Revised Edition, with the Imprimatur of His Eminence Cardinal Gibbons. Baltimore: John Murphy Company, 1916. pp. 323–324.
 Rev. Richard Stanton. A Menology of England and Wales, or, Brief Memorials of the Ancient British and English Saints Arranged According to the Calendar, Together with the Martyrs of the 16th and 17th Centuries. London: Burns & Oates, 1892. pp. 507–508.
Greek Sources
 Great Synaxaristes:  20 ΟΚΤΩΒΡΙΟΥ. ΜΕΓΑΣ ΣΥΝΑΞΑΡΙΣΤΗΣ.
  Συναξαριστής. 20 Οκτωβρίου. ECCLESIA.GR. (H ΕΚΚΛΗΣΙΑ ΤΗΣ ΕΛΛΑΔΟΣ).
  20/10/2017. Ορθόδοξος Συναξαριστής. 
Russian Sources
  2 ноября (20 октября). Православная Энциклопедия под редакцией Патриарха Московского и всея Руси Кирилла (электронная версия). (Orthodox Encyclopedia - Pravenc.ru).
  20 октября по старому стилю / 2 ноября по новому стилю. Русская Православная Церковь - Православный церковный календарь на 2016 год.

October in the Eastern Orthodox calendar